The 1930 Idaho gubernatorial election was held on November 4. Democratic nominee C. Ben Ross, mayor of Pocatello, defeated Republican nominee John McMurray with 56.03% of the vote. Ross' victory broke a streak of six consecutive election wins (1918–28) by Republicans; he was re-elected in 1932 and 1934.

General election

Candidates
C. Ben Ross, Democratic
John McMurray, Republican

Results

References

1930
Idaho
Gubernatorial